A god worshiped in pre-Islamic southern Arabia, particularly Sheba. Haubas's advice was often sought via consultation with oracles.

References

Arabian gods
Oracular gods